The name Haughton may refer to:

Places

In the United Kingdom
 Haughton Castle, Northumberland, England
 Haughton, Cheshire, England
 Haughton, Greater Manchester, England
 Haughton, Nottinghamshire, England
 Haughton, Shropshire, England, four hamlets; see List of places in Shropshire
 Haughton, Staffordshire, England
 Haughton Green, Greater Manchester, England
 Haughton-le-Skerne, County Durham, England

Elsewhere
 Haughton, Louisiana, USA
 Haughton impact crater, Devon Island, Canada

Other uses
 Haughton (name), a given name and surname
 Haughton v Smith, an important British legal case
 Haughton–Mars Project, a spaceflight analog research project
 Haughton Hall, 18th-century country house, Shifnal, Shropshire, England
 Haughton Academy, Darlington, County Durham, England
 Haughton High School, Haughton, Louisiana, USA

See also
 Hawton
Horton (surname)
Horton (disambiguation)
 Hoghton (disambiguation)
 Houghton (disambiguation)